Barry Griffiths (born 21 November 1940) is an English former footballer who played as a goalkeeper.

Griffiths moved from Sheffield Wednesday to Blackburn Rovers as a youth and played in the 1958–59 FA Youth Cup Final.

He made two senior appearances for Rovers, before moving to Altrincham.

References

1940 births
Living people
Footballers from Manchester
English footballers
Association football goalkeepers
Sheffield Wednesday F.C. players
Blackburn Rovers F.C. players
Altrincham F.C. players